Big Brother Canada 9 is the ninth season of the Canadian reality television series Big Brother Canada. The series began filming on February 27, 2021 and premiered on March 3, 2021 on Global. Hosted by Arisa Cox, the show revolved around fourteen contestants (known as HouseGuests), who volunteered to reside in a house while being constantly filmed without any communication with the outside world as they compete to win a grand prize of CA$100,000.

The season concluded on May 6, 2021 after 69 days of competition. It was won by urban planner Tychon Carter-Newman, who defeated anthropology student Breydon White in a 6-1 jury vote. Carter-Newman is the first Black Canadian to win a season of Big Brother Canada, and the second to win a season among North American Big Brother adaptations, after Tamar Braxton of the second season of the American celebrity spin-off. Kiefer Collison won an online vote to become this season's Canada's Favourite HouseGuest, being the first to receive such distinction.

Production

Development 
Following the cancellation of the eighth season due to the COVID-19 pandemic, the future of the show was left uncertain, however on July 13, 2020, Big Brother Canada was renewed for a ninth season. It was also announced that Arisa Cox would return as host and would assume the role of executive producer for the new season. Casting began on August 10, 2020, with Kassting Inc. returning to provide casting services for the show. On February 17, 2021, Global announced that the season will start airing with a two-night premiere on March 3–4, 2021. On February 17, 2021, Global announced that the season will start airing with a two-night premiere on March 3–4, 2021.

Release 
The free 24/7 live feeds, hosted on Big Brother Canadas website, started on March 4 after the first eviction episode. A tribute to Big Brother Canada 4 HouseGuest Nikki Grahame aired on the 18th episode following her death.

Production design 

On February 22, 2021, Global released an image of the living room wall. The theme for the season was confirmed to be post-apocalyptic. The full house design was revealed on March 1, with most of the house being similar to the season 8 superhero themed house, but with decorative fake vines and overgrowth covering large portions of the house. The bathroom, the HoH bedroom the outdoor spa area, and the Expedia-themed lounge room remained the same as last season. Of the few rooms to be completely redesigned was the main bedrooms, which were redecorated to correspond the theme of each team. The swamp themed Have-Not room was replaced by a ball-pit. Additionally, there was no nomination room, with the space normally taken by the nomination room being used as a OLG themed games room.

Prizes 
The HouseGuests competed for a grand prize of a $110,000 cash prize (consisting of the base prize of $100,000 with an additional $10,000 provided by sponsor Sunlight), $10,000 worth of grills and grilling accessories from Weber, and a vacation for two from Expedia. The runner-up wins $20,000. A new prize for "Canada's Favourite Houseguest" was also introduced this season, where the Canadian public voted for the recipient of a $10,000 prize.

HouseGuests 

The HouseGuests' images and profiles were released on Wednesday, February 24, 2021. Initially announced HouseGuest Ethan Quance was later removed when significant concerns were brought to the attention of production. He was replaced by Kyle Moore.

Future appearances
In 2022, Tychon Carter-Newman, with his father Cedrick competed on The Amazing Race Canada 8.

Format 

Big Brother Canada follows a group of contestants, known as HouseGuests who move into a custom-built house outfitted with cameras and microphones, recording their every move 24 hours a day. The HouseGuests are sequestered in the Big Brother Canada House with no contact with the outside world. During their stay, the HouseGuests share their thoughts on events and other HouseGuests inside a private room referred to as the Diary Room. At the start of each week in the house, the HouseGuests compete for the title of Head of Household, often shortened to simply HoH. The winner of the HoH competition is immune from eviction and will name two HouseGuests to be nominated for eviction. After the nominees are determined, the Power of Veto competition is played. Five players will compete in the competition: the two nominees and three random players, with the winner receiving the Power of Veto. If a HouseGuest chooses to exercise the Power of Veto, the Head of Household is obligated to name a replacement nominee. The holder of the Power of Veto is safe from being nominated as the replacement nominee. On eviction night, all HouseGuests must vote to evict one of the nominees, with the exception of the nominees and the Head of Household. The eviction vote is by secret ballot, with HouseGuests casting their votes orally in the Diary Room. In the event of a tied vote, the Head of Household will cast a tie-breaking vote publicly. The nominee with the majority of the votes is evicted from the house. Midway through the season, the evicted HouseGuests go on to become members of the "jury"; the jury is responsible for choosing who wins the series. The final Head of Household competition is split into three parts; the winners of the first two rounds compete in the third and final round. Once only two HouseGuests remain, the members of the jury cast their votes for who should win the series.

Twists

Team twist 
For the first time in Big Brother Canada, the HouseGuests will compete in two teams (known as Team Destiny & Team Defender). The teams were selected by Team Captains determined by Canada's Vote, which opened as the cast was revealed. The Captains are also awarded immunity for the first week. For the duration of the teams phase the Head of Household would win immunity for their entire team. The draft for the teams was as follows:

Summary

Episodes

Have-Nots 
At the start of each week, a group of HouseGuests are selected to become the Have-Nots for the week. Those selected to be the Have-Nots are restricted to a slop diet and cold showers, and are required to sleep in an uncomfortable room. Each week, a "Skip the Slop" online public vote is held. The winner of the vote (indicated by strikethrough) will receive a free meal from SkipTheDishes and have their Have-Not status nullified for the remainder of the week. The vote was held every week where Have-Nots were named, with the exception of Week 5.

Voting history 
Team Phase
At the beginning of the game, the HouseGuests competed in two teams. These are noted by color ( Team Defender  Team Destiny). As part of the team format, the Head of Household would also win immunity for their team (indicated by ). On Day 13, the game reverted to the regular format, with the HouseGuests playing as individuals.

Notes 

 :  When the cast was revealed, voting opened for Canada to vote for two Team Captains. Kiefer and Tina were voted captains and chose their teams. The captains were also given immunity from the first eviction.
 :  On Night 1, the HouseGuests competed in a team competition. The winning team won immunity from the first eviction, while the members of the losing team (excluding their captain) were all nominated for the first eviction. Since there were six nominees, all nominees voted. As the winning captain, Tina would only vote in the event of a tie.
 :  This week, the Head of Household was invisible. The winner of the HoH competition would not be announced to the HouseGuests, and their nominations would be made in secret. Additionally, to disguise the Invisible HoH, they were eligible to compete for the Power of Veto, and could compete the following week to be HoH; however, they were also eligible to be a Have-Not, and did not have access to the HoH Suite. 
 : This week was a double eviction week. Following the first eviction, the remaining HouseGuests played a week's worth of games, including HoH and Veto competitions and Nomination, Veto and Eviction ceremonies, during the remainder of the live show, culminating in a second eviction for the night. 
 : This week was a fake double eviction night. Following the first eviction, the remaining HouseGuests played a week's worth of games, including HoH and PoV competitions, and Nomination, Veto, and Eviction ceremonies, during the remainder of the live show, culminating in two HouseGuests being voted out. HouseGuests who were voted out (Jedson & Tera) were secretly moved to the HoH suite until the end of the night when the pair competed in a competition to determine which of the two would be evicted. Tera won the competition, evicting Jedson.
 : During the finale, the Jury voted for which finalist should win Big Brother Canada 9.

Reception

Critical Reception 
Big Brother Canada 9 was generally well received by critics and viewers, with praise being directed at the diverse cast and the unpredictability of the course of the season. Justin Carreiro of the Young Folks wrote a positive review of the season, stating that it was a "fun and captivating season that gave fans exactly what we needed".

Controversy 

On February 24, 2021, Global announced 22-year-old Ethan Quance, a line cook from Banff, Alberta as one of the fourteen HouseGuests competing in the ninth season. However the following day, several allegations were made against him including sexual assault and the use of racist and homophobic language. As a result, Global made the decision to remove Quance from the cast and announced that he would be replaced prior to the premiere. He was replaced with Kyle Moore.

Viewing figures

References

External links 
Global official site

2021 Canadian television seasons
Big Brother Canada seasons